Wajir North Constituency is an electoral constituency in Kenya. It is one of six constituencies in Wajir County. The constituency has seven wards, all electing councillors to the Wajir County Council. The constituency was established for the 1997 elections.

.

Members of Parliament

Wards

References 

Constituencies in Wajir County
Constituencies in North Eastern Province (Kenya)
1997 establishments in Kenya
Constituencies established in 1997